Denim and Leather is the fourth studio album by English heavy metal band Saxon released in 1981. The album was certified Gold status in the U.K. This was the last album with the classic line up of Saxon, as drummer Pete Gill would leave the band due to a hand injury, later joining Motörhead; this was also seen as the last of their triptych of classic albums (the previous two being Wheels of Steel and Strong Arm of the Law).

Song notes
The album spawned two of their most successful singles, "And the Bands Played On" and "Princess of the Night". There are nine songs on this album, which are noted for lyrics about a wide range of topics. "Princess of the Night" is a song about a powerful steam locomotive and "And the Bands Played On" is about 1980 Monsters of Rock Festival – name checking Rainbow. Other themes for the songs include: partying, the spirit of the music, fighting, and, like many of their songs, motorcycles. "Midnight Rider" is a song about Saxon's 1980 North American tour.

The name of the album and song was inspired by the popular attire of metalheads in the early 1980s, defined by either denim jeans and jackets or a leather biker jacket (often worn with a denim cut-off waistcoat). The song is seen as a tribute from the band to their fans while describing the history of the sub-culture and the rise of the new wave of British heavy metal (NWOBHM).

Reception

The album peaked at #9 in the UK Albums Chart.

The album is regarded as a classic in the band's discography, and has been received positively by critics and fans. Eduardo Rivadavia of AllMusic called the opening track "Princess of the Night" an "infectiously anthemic opening statement", whilst praising the title track for also being an "unqualified classic". He considered "Out of Control" and "Rough and Ready" to be strong tracks, whilst regarding "Fire in the Sky", "Midnight Rider", and "And The Bands Played On" as "spectacular". Canadian journalist Martin Popoff had mixed feelings about Denim and Leather, which he considered "Saxon's stadium rock album... boppier and sillier than Wheels of Steel, but still catchy", denouncing "the band's progressively feeble song skills while gaining points for conviction."

Track listing

Bonus tracks 12-18 recorded live on the Denim and Leather Tour, 1981.

Personnel
Biff Byford – vocals
Paul Quinn – guitars
Graham Oliver – guitars
Steve Dawson – bass
Pete Gill – drums

 Production
 Nigel Thomas – production 
 Andy Lyden – engineering
 Aquarius Studios, Geneva – recording location
 Polar Studios, Stockholm – additional recording location, mixing location
 Blechner Poxon – manager

Charts

Album

Singles

Certifications

References

Saxon (band) albums
1981 albums
Carrere Records albums